According to the Book of Mormon, Antipus was a Nephite military commander who lived in the 1st century BC.  The story of Antipus and his army is detailed in the 56th chapter of the Book of Alma.  In 66 BC Antipus' army was strengthened with the 2,000 warriors under the leadership of Helaman.  Helaman and Antipus engaged the invading Lamanite army by a stratagem in which Helaman and his 2,000 played decoy.  Helaman was to lead away the Lamanite army while Antipus attacked from behind.  After three days of the Lamanites pursuing Helaman, Antipus and his army finally overtook and engaged the Lamanites.  However, in the battle Antipus was slain and his army only avoided complete defeat when Helaman and his 2,000 also joined the battle.

References

Book of Mormon people